Sanctuary is a 1994 play by Australian playwright David Williamson. He said "The play taps into the new radicalism among students in communications. They know about the power elite, come out breathing fire about the state of the Australian media and usually end up working for the major broadsheets." He added, "the
real theme of Sanctuary is male competitiveness. Ironically the young student in Sanctuary yearns to be like Bob King while pretending that's the last thing in the world he wants."

Summary
Sanctuary is a two-act play set in the Gold Coast retreat belonging to retired Australian foreign correspondent Robert 'Bob' King (late 40s). Mr King has lived a full life of charismatic success in the US reporting on stories from all around the world. His integrity comes under scrutiny in the play by its only other character, John Alderston (25), a student about to publish King's biography. John harbours a deep hatred for King because of his dishonesty throughout his career and failure to report on four major genocides.

It becomes apparent that through John's research he has compiled an account of King's life, and seeks to hold him accountable for unquestionable serving the American and International mass media. He argues that King sold himself out to Governments for cash, telling selected stories the way he was instructed to. He also mistreated his various wives and ignored larger world issues for the sake of his own success.

Williamson chiefly refers to Guatemala, East Timor, El Salvador and Cambodia as illustrations, but the focus is alway on King's integrity and how he let those stories go untold.

John's character is seen to become more and more complex as King probes back, uncovering a history of parental neglect and sexual abuse, which appears to be the sewing of John's hatred long ago. As the story unfolds violent arguments beak out and result in a savage beating, in which John temporarily blinds Bob at the end of the first act. the second act is composed of similar arguments as each challenges each other's true values.

Bob gives a good account of his life and attempts to pardon himself, while John (panicking over possible jail time for the assault) refuses to call emergency help for Bob (still blind). In the end Bob convinces John to call an ambulance, before another violent outburst sends John into a psychotic frenzy, in which he beats Bob to death with a ceramic sculpture.

The result is a thorough dissection of the shortcomings of the mass media, a detailed explanation of several world issues which had gone falsely reported or not reported at all, and a remotely humorous argument between two deeply disturbed people.

Background
Williamson later said he wrote the play "in just ten days, in the white heat of passion and disgust at American foreign policy in Iraq – sometimes the momentum just takes over.”

Reception
Reviews for the play were excellent.

Film

The play was filmed in the 1990s. Its setting was changed from the Gold Coast to Sydney.

References

External links
Sanctuary at IMDb

Plays by David Williamson
1994 plays
Films based on works by David Williamson
Plays set in Australia
Australian plays adapted into films
1990s English-language films